was a renowned Japanese photographer.

References

Japanese photographers
1830 births
1889 deaths